Sandra Isabelle "Sandy" Jerstad is a Democratic member of the South Dakota Senate, who represented the 12th district, being elected in 2006. Senator Jerstad sought reelection in 2010 but was defeated in the general election by Republican Mark Johnston.

Jerstad was a softball coach at Augustana College (South Dakota) from 1977 to 2003. With 1,011 wins, she is in the National Fastpitch Coaches Association Hall of Fame.

External links
South Dakota Legislature - Sandy Jerstad official SD Senate website

Project Vote Smart - Senator Sandy Jerstad (SD) profile
Follow the Money - Sandy Jerstad
2008 2006 campaign contributions

South Dakota state senators
1943 births
Living people
Women state legislators in South Dakota
American softball coaches
Augustana (South Dakota) Vikings softball coaches
St. Olaf College alumni
Augustana University people
21st-century American politicians
21st-century American women politicians